Olivia Grüner (born 4 March 1969) is a former German mountain runner who won 1985 World Mountain Running Championships.

References

External links
 Olivia Grüner profile at Association of Road Racing Statisticians

1969 births
Living people
Place of birth missing (living people)
German female mountain runners
World Mountain Running Championships winners